Colin Rösler (born 22 April 2000) is a professional footballer who plays as a centre-back for Norwegian club Lillestrøm.

Rösler was born in Berlin, Germany, and grew up in both Norway and England. After progressing through Manchester City's academy, he joined Dutch club NAC Breda in 2019. After 44 league appearances for NAC, Rösler joined Norwegian club Lillestrøm for the 2022 season. He has represented both Norway and England in youth internationals but pledged international allegiance to Norway in 2016.

Early life
Rösler is the son of German football manager Uwe Rösler. He was named after Manchester City legend Colin Bell, whilst his younger brother Tony was named after fellow City legend Tony Book.

Rösler was born in Berlin to a Norwegian mother, but his family moved to Lillestrøm in 2002. He moved to England aged 10, and joined Manchester City's academy a year later.

Club career
After progressing through Manchester City's youth academy, Rösler signed for Eerste Divisie club NAC Breda on a three-year contract in August 2019. He joined NAC on a free transfer as part of a partnership between the two clubs. He initially played in central defence for Breda alongside Roger Riera. He played 11 games for NAC during the 2019–20 Eerste Divisie season. He made 25 appearances during the 2020–21 season, including scoring his first senior goal from close range in a 3–1 win over De Graafschap in March 2021. As his spell at NAC continued, Rösler was increasingly overlooked and made just 8 appearances during the 2021–22 season.

On 30 December 2021, it was announced that Rösler had signed for Eliteserien club Lillestrøm SK on a contract until 2024. Lillestrøm paid no transfer fee to NAC, but NAC retained a sell-on fee in Rösler's contract.

International career
Rösler was capped four times by Norway at under-15 level in 2015, scoring in their 4–4 draw with Northern Ireland. He subsequently played internationally for England under-16s, but in February 2016, pledged international allegiance to Norway. He subsequently played for Norway at under-16, under-17, under-18, under-19 and under-21 levels.

Career statistics

References

External links

2000 births
Living people
Norwegian footballers
German footballers
Footballers from Berlin
Association football midfielders
Norway youth international footballers
England youth international footballers
Viking FK players
Manchester City F.C. players
NAC Breda players
Lillestrøm SK players
Eerste Divisie players
Eliteserien players
Norwegian expatriate footballers
German expatriate footballers
Norwegian expatriate sportspeople in the Netherlands
German expatriate sportspeople in the Netherlands
Expatriate footballers in the Netherlands